The Type 95/98 machine gun was designed by Prototypa, a.s. (Czech Republic). This weapon is intended for the modernized Czech T-72 tanks.

This gun can fire both 7.62×51 NATO and 7.62×54R ammunition.

External links 
 Designer page about weapon (bottom of page)
 Army page about T-72 mentioning vz 95/98

Medium machine guns
Machine guns of Czechoslovakia
Tank guns of Czechoslovakia